The 2021 Canadian Olympic Curling Trials (branded as the 2021 Tim Hortons Curling Trials for sponsorship reasons) were held from November 20 to 28 at the SaskTel Centre in Saskatoon, Saskatchewan. The winners of the men's and women's events represented Canada at the 2022 Winter Olympics.

In the women's final, the Jennifer Jones rink from Winnipeg defeated Tracy Fleury's East St. Paul, Manitoba rink 6–5 in an extra end. The win sent Jones back to the Olympics for the first time since winning a gold medal at the 2014 Winter Olympics. Jones had a chance to win the game in the tenth end with an easy hit and stay to score two points, but her release was tight, and her rock ended up rolling too far, settling for one point, and tying the game 5–5. In the final end, with last rock advantage, Fleury had a chance to win on her final shot, playing a soft-weight hit on a Jones rock. However, her rock curled too much and hit a guard, giving up a point and the game to Jones. For Jones and leads Dawn McEwen and Lisa Weagle, the win led to their second trip to the Olympics (Weagle went to the 2018 Winter Olympics as a member of team Rachel Homan). Third Kaitlyn Lawes qualified for her third Olympics, after also playing in the 2018 Olympics in the mixed doubles curling event, where she won gold. For second Jocelyn Peterman, it was her first Olympics.  

In the men's final, Newfoundland and Labrador's Brad Gushue rink defeated Sault Ste. Marie, Ontario's Brad Jacobs rink 4–3 to send Gushue back to the Olympics for the first time since he won a gold medal at the 2006 Winter Olympics. The game was a low scoring affair, with both teams either getting singles or blanks, until Gushue scored two points in the ninth end to take a 4–2 lead. In the tenth and final end, Jacobs had a chance to make a tough hit and stick to tie the game, but was wide and rolled out, settling for just one point, losing the game. Gushue and his third Mark Nichols qualified for their second trip to the Olympics after 2006, but it was the first time for their front end of Brett Gallant and Geoff Walker.

Qualification process
Due to the COVID-19 pandemic in Canada, the qualification process had to be revised for the event as the 2020 Canada Cup was cancelled. Instead of the usual pool of teams that was designated as eligible to represent Canada at the Olympics, more qualification events were needed to allow the teams that made changes in the off-season to qualify. The winner of each trials will represent Canada at the 2022 Winter Olympics.

Nine teams qualified for the Olympic Trials based on the following criteria.

Men

Women

Men

Teams

Round robin standings
Final Round Robin Standings

Round robin results
All draw times are listed in Central Time (UTC−06:00).

Draw 2
Saturday, November 20, 7:00 pm

Draw 4
Sunday, November 21, 2:00 pm

Draw 6
Monday, November 22, 2:00 pm

Draw 8
Tuesday, November 23, 2:00 pm

Draw 10
Wednesday, November 24, 9:00 am

Draw 12
Wednesday, November 24, 7:00 pm

Draw 14
Thursday, November 25, 2:00 pm

Draw 16
Friday, November 26, 9:00 am

Draw 18
Friday, November 26, 7:00 pm

Playoffs

Semifinal
Saturday, November 27, 2:00 pm

Final
Sunday, November 28, 7:00 pm

Top 5 player percentages
Round Robin only

Women

Teams

Round robin standings
Final Round Robin Standings

Round robin results
All draw times are listed in Central Time (UTC−06:00).

Draw 1
Saturday, November 20, 2:00 pm

Draw 3
Sunday, November 21, 9:00 am

Draw 5
Sunday, November 21, 7:00 pm

Draw 7
Monday, November 22, 7:00 pm

Draw 9
Tuesday, November 23, 7:00 pm

Draw 11
Wednesday, November 24, 2:00 pm

Draw 13
Thursday, November 25, 9:00 am

Draw 15
Thursday, November 25, 7:00 pm

Draw 17
Friday, November 26, 2:00 pm

Tiebreakers

Tiebreaker 1
Saturday, November 27, 9:00 am

Tiebreaker 2
Saturday, November 27, 2:00 pm

Playoffs

Semifinal
Saturday, November 27, 7:00 pm

Final
Sunday, November 28, 2:00 pm

Top 5 player percentages
Round Robin only

Qualification events

Trials Direct-Entry Event

The Trials Direct-Entry Event took place from September 22 to 26, 2021 at the RA Centre in Ottawa, Ontario. To qualify for the event, teams had to fall under one of these three categories:
 Canadian teams in the top 18 of the World Curling Team Ranking as of August 31, 2020,
 Eligible teams that finished in the top 9 of the Canadian Team Ranking System in 2019–20,
 Eligible teams that finished in the top 7 of the Canadian Team Ranking System in 2018–19.

The teams that didn't qualify for the trials via this event had a second chance to make the trials through the Pre-Trials.

For the men's tournament, there were 2 spots available in the trials for direct-entry. For the women's tournament, there were 3 spots available.

Men

Teams
The teams are listed as follows:

Round robin standings
Final round robin standings

Qualifying round standings
Final Qualifying Round standings
Note: one game (Flasch vs. Howard) was not played as Dunstone and McEwen had already qualified.

Women

Teams
The teams are listed as follows:

Round robin standings
Final round robin standings

Playoff

Team Walker had to be beaten twice.

Pre-Trials Direct-Entry Event

The Canadian Curling Pre-Trials Direct-Entry Event was held concurrently with the Trials Direct-Entry event September 22 to 26 at the RA Centre in Ottawa. Eight teams of each gender competed for two berths each at the Pre-Trials in Liverpool.

Men

Teams
The teams are listed as follows:

Knockout brackets

Source:

A Event

B Event

C Event

Playoffs

Women

Teams
The teams are listed as follows:

Knockout brackets

Source:

A Event

B Event

C Event

Playoffs

Pre-Trials

The Home Hardware Pre-Trials will be held October 26 to 31 at the Queens Place Emera Centre in Liverpool, Nova Scotia.

Men

Teams
The teams are listed as follows:

Round robin standings
Final round robin standings

Playoffs

Women

Teams
The teams are listed as follows:

Round robin standings
Final round robin standings

Playoffs

Notes

References

External links
 Curling Canada - 2021 Trials Process Announced. Curling Canada. Retrieved Feb 5, 2021

2021 in Canadian curling
2021 in Saskatchewan
Curling in Saskatoon
Canadian Olympic Curling Trials
Curling at the 2022 Winter Olympics
Qualification for the 2022 Winter Olympics
Canadian Olympic Curling Trials